The Protein Society is an international, not-for-profit, scholarly society with the mission to provide forums for the advancement of research into protein structure, function, design and applications.

History
It was founded in 1986, with the leadership of Ralph Bradshaw, Finn Wold, David Eisenberg, Ken Walsh,  Hans Neurath, and other protein researchers from diverse fields.

Ralph Bradshaw was the society's first president, followed by David Eisenberg, Finn Wold, Mark Hermodson, Joseph Villafranca, Brian Matthews, Robert Sauer, Christopher Dobson, Wiliam DeGrado, C. Robert Matthews, Jeffrey Kelly, Arthur Palmer, Daniel Raleigh, Lynne Regan, James U. Bowie, Carol Post, Charles L. Brooks III, Amy E. Keating, Chuck R. Sanders.

Journal

The Editor-in-Chief of Protein Science is John Kuriyan. 

Impact factor:6.725. 

In 1987, the Society began publishing the trans-disciplinary academic journal Protein Science, with Hans Neurath serving as Editor-in-chief.  Protein science researchers from varying disciplines, as well as educators and students from greater than 50 countries make up the membership.

The journal covers research on the structure, function, and biochemical significance of proteins, their role in molecular and cell biology, genetics, and evolution, and their regulation and mechanisms of action.

Symposium
The society organizes an annual symposium which hosts hundreds of participants from all over the world, features research presentations by leaders from the diverse fields involved in protein science, a graduate student poster competition, networking opportunities, free undergraduate registration, educational workshops, and the annual presentation of the Protein Society's Awards.

 In 2014, the symposium took place in San Diego, California, United States July 27 to 30, 2014. 
 In 2015, the 29th Symposium of the Protein Society was held in Barcelona, Spain. 
In 2016, the 30th Anniversary Symposium of the Protein Society was held in Baltimore, Maryland 
 In 2017, the 31st Symposium of the Protein Society was held in Montreal, Quebec, Canada, July 24–27, 2017, 2016.
 In 2018, the 32nd Symposium of the Protein Society was held in Boston, Massachusetts, United States July 9–12, 2018.
 In 2019, the 33rd Symposium of the Protein Society was held in Seattle, United States Jun 30 - July 2019.
In 2020, the 34th Symposium was planned in partnership with PSSJ and APPA, to be held in Sapporo, Japan.  The meeting was canceled due to COVID-19.
In 2021, the 35th Anniversary Symposium was held virtually, July 7-9 & 12-14, 2021.
In 2022, the 36th Symposium is planned to be held in San Francisco, California, United States, July 7-10, 2022
In 2023, the 37th Symposium is planned to be held in Boston, Massachusetts, United States, July 13-16, 2023
In 2024, the 38th Symposium is planned to be held inVancouver, Canada, July 23-26, 2024
In 2025, the 39th Symposium is planned to be held in San Francisco, California, United States, June 26-29, 2025
In 2027, the 41st Symposium is planned to be held in San Francisco, California, United States, July 9-12, 2027

Awards
The Protein Society presents eight awards each year:
 Carl Brändén Award
 Christian B. Anfinsen Award
 Dorothy Crowfoot Hodgkin Award
 Emil Thomas Kaiser Award
 Hans Neurath Award
 Stein & Moore Award
 Protein Science Young Investigator Award
 Marie Daly Award

References

External links
 
 Protein Science
 Awards presented by the society
www.diversifyproteinscience.org

Chemistry societies
Organizations established in 1986
Scientific organizations based in the United States
Biology societies
1986 establishments in the United States